Sakra Assembly constituency is an assembly constituency in Muzaffarpur district in the Indian state of Bihar. It is reserved for scheduled castes.

Overview
As per Delimitation of Parliamentary and Assembly constituencies Order, 2008, No. 92 Sakra Assembly constituency (SC) is composed of the following: Sakra and Dholi Muraul community development blocks.

Sakra Assembly constituency is part of No. 15 Muzaffarpur (Lok Sabha constituency).

Members of Legislative Assembly

Election results

1977-2020
In 2020 assembly elections Ashok Kumar Choudhary of JDU became MLA by defeating Umesh Kumar Ram of INC.However, there was a difference of only 1537 in the total votes of these two.In the 2015 state assembly election, Lal Babu Ram of RJD defeated Arjun Ram of BJP. In the 2010 state assembly elections, Suresh Chanchal of JD(U) won the Sakra assembly seat defeating his nearest rival Lal Babu Ram of RJD. Contests in most years were multi cornered but only winners and runners up are being mentioned. Bilal Paswan of JD(U) defeated Lal Babu Ram of RJD in October 2005 and Dr. Shital Ram of RJD in February 2005. Dr. Sital Ram of RJD defeated Bilal Paswan of JD(U) in 2000. Kamal Paswan of JD defeated Bilal Paswan representing Congress in 1995 and 1990. Shivnandan Paswan of LD defeated Arun Kumar Ch. Of Congress in 1985. Fakir Chand Ram of Congress defeated Paltan Ram of Janata Party (Secular – Charan Singh) in 1980. Shivnadan Paswan of JP defeated Fakir Chand Ram of Congress in 1977.

2020

References

External links
 

Assembly constituencies of Bihar
Politics of Muzaffarpur district